Hemiscopis violacea is a moth in the family Crambidae. It was described by Thomas Pennington Lucas in 1892. It is found in Australia, where it has been recorded from Queensland.

The wingspan is about 15 mm. The forewings are brown with two indistinct purplish bands.

References

Moths described in 1892
Odontiinae